α-Zearalenol is a nonsteroidal estrogen of the resorcylic acid lactone group related to mycoestrogens found in Fusarium spp. It is the α epimer of β-zearalenol and along with β-zearalenol is a major metabolite of zearalenone formed mainly in the liver but also to a lesser extent in the intestines during first-pass metabolism. A relatively low proportion of β-zearalenol is formed from zearalenone compared to α-zearalenol in humans. α-Zearalenol is about 3- to 4-fold more potent as an estrogen relative to zearalenone.

See also
 Taleranol (β-zearalanol)
 Zeranol (α-zearalanol)
 Zearalanone

References

Lactones
Mycoestrogens
Mycotoxins
Resorcinols